Tingena robiginosa is a species of moth in the family Oecophoridae. It is endemic to New Zealand and has been observed in the southern parts of the South Island. It has been observed in subalpine habitats at altitudes of between 2700 and 3500 ft amongst Hebe and Cassinia species. The adults of this species are on the wing in December and January.

Taxonomy 

This species was first described by Alfred Philpott in 1915 using specimens collected in the Longwood Range and the Hunter Mountains, and named Borkhausenia robiginosa. George Hudson discussed and illustrated this species under the name Borkhausenia robiginosa in his 1928 publication The butterflies and moths of New Zealand. Philpott also discussed this species under the name B. robiginosa and illustrated the male genitalia. In 1988 J. S. Dugdale placed this species within the genus Tingena. The male holotype, collected in the Longwood Range, is held in the New Zealand Arthropod Collection.

Description 

Philpott described this species as follows:
This species is similar in appearance to its close relative T. basella but can be distinguished by the differences in the antennae of these species.

Distribution
This species is endemic to New Zealand and has been observed in the Longwood Range, in the Hunter Mountains, in the Otago Lakes area, in Fiordland, and at Arthur's Pass.

Behaviour
The adults of this species are on the wing in December and January.

Habitat
This species has been found in subalpine habitats at altitudes ranging from 2700 ft up to 3,500 ft amongst Hebe and Cassinia species.

References

Oecophoridae
Moths of New Zealand
Moths described in 1915
Endemic fauna of New Zealand
Taxa named by Alfred Philpott
Endemic moths of New Zealand